#Like is a Philippine television talent reality show broadcast by GMA Network. Hosted by Tom Rodriguez and Balang, it premiered on September 3, 2016 on the network's Sabado Star Power sa Hapon line up replacing Laff Camera Action. The show concluded on February 11, 2017 with a total of 24 episodes. It was replaced by Case Solved in its timeslot.

Ratings
According to AGB Nielsen Philippines' Urban Luzon television ratings, the pilot episode of #Like earned a 16.3% rating. While the final episode scored an 11.1% rating in Nationwide Urban Television Audience Measurement.

Accolades

References

External links
 

2016 Philippine television series debuts
2017 Philippine television series endings
Filipino-language television shows
GMA Network original programming
Philippine reality television series
Television series about social media